Rocksprings High School is a public high school located in Rocksprings, Texas (USA) and classified as a 1A school by the UIL. It is part of the Rocksprings Independent School District located in central Edwards County. In 2015, the school was rated "Met Standard" by the Texas Education Agency.

UIL

Rocksprings High School competes in UIL academics, in 2018 three students went to state to compete.

School

The school is 1A but competes in 2A football. Rocksprings is the smallest school in Texas to play 11-man football.

Teaching Staff

As of 2018 there are 6 teachers (not including class aides, administrative workers, etc.)

Athletics
The Rocksprings Angoras compete in these sports - 

Basketball
Cross Country
Football
Golf
Powerlifting
Tennis
Track and Field
Volleyball

State titles
Boys Cross Country - 
1991(1A), 1996(1A), 1998(1A)
Girls Cross Country - 
1994(1A), 1995(1A), 1996(1A), 1997(1A)
Boys Track - 
1997(1A)
Girls Track - 
1996(1A), 1997(1A)

References

External links
Rocksprings ISD

Public high schools in Texas
Education in Edwards County, Texas